A callus is an anatomical feature that exists in some mollusk shells, a thickened area of shell material that can partly or completely cover the  umbilicus, or can be located as a coating on the body whorl near the aperture of the shell (i.e. a parietal callus or columellar callus). It is a hardened deposit of enamel, which varies in coloration and size depending on the species 

A callus exists in the shells of various species of gastropods (snails) and also in the shells of several species of Nautilus, a cephalopod.

A callum is an anatomical feature of some mature bivalve shells of species in the family Pholadidae, the piddocks. The callum is an area of shell material that fills the gap between the two valves.

References

http://naturemappingfoundation.org/natmap/mollusks/glossary.html

Mollusc shells